The  Dallas Cowboys season was the franchise's 55th season in the National Football League (NFL), the sixth playing their home games at AT&T Stadium and the fourth full season under head coach Jason Garrett.

The team improved on their 8–8 record from 2013, finishing 12–4 in a three-way tie for first place in the NFC. However, the Cowboys lost tiebreakers to both the Seattle Seahawks and Green Bay Packers and had to start their postseason in the Wild Card round. They started with a tough 24–20 win over the Detroit Lions before losing to the Packers 26–21 the following week, ending their season.

2014 draft class

Notes
 The Cowboys traded their original second-round (No. 47 overall) and third-round (No. 78 overall) selections to the Washington Redskins in exchange for a second-round (No. 34 overall) selection.
The Cowboys traded tight end Dante Rosario to the Chicago Bears for a seventh-round (No. 229 overall) selection.
The Cowboys traded their fifth-round (No. 158 overall) and seventh-round (No. 229 overall, acquired from Chicago) selections to the Detroit Lions in exchange for a fifth-round (No. 146 overall) selection.
 The Cowboys traded their sixth-round (No. 193 overall) selection to the Kansas City Chiefs in exchange for linebacker Edgar Jones and a seventh-round (No. 238 overall) selection.

Offseason
After the departure of long time Cowboy favorites DE/LB DeMarcus Ware and DT Jason Hatcher to free agency, and a season-ending knee injury to MLB Sean Lee during Organized Team Activity in late May, the Dallas Cowboys were one of the most heavily admonished and second-guessed NFL franchises through the entire preseason and well into the regular season. Much of the criticism was in response to the Cowboys selecting Notre Dame offensive guard Zack Martin over the perceived Cowboys savior (Texas A&M QB Johnny Manziel) in the first round of the NFL draft. Even Cowboys owner Jerry Jones uncharacteristically downplayed expectations for the upcoming season during spring training, emphasizing to the media and fans that it might take a little more time for the Cowboys' young players to mature into a championship-caliber team.

Regular season
Adding injury to the many insults hurled at Jerry Jones, QB Tony Romo and the Cowboys organization in general, Romo did not play well during two preseason starts after receiving only a small percentage of snaps throughout training camp, due to his continuing recovery from off-season surgery to repair a herniated intervertebral disc in his lower back. For these reasons, Romo and the Cowboys' passing offense struggled for the first two games of the regular season, causing many fans and media to declare the Dallas Cowboys as the absolute worst team in the league after their week 1 loss to the 49ers at AT&T Stadium. A humiliating turnover led to defeat for Dallas, which appeared to prove all the Cowboys' critics right, that Jerry Jones should have selected QB Johnny "Football" Manziel in the first round of the NFL 2014 draft to eventually replace Romo. But by season's end, not only would Romo have the highest passer rating (113.2) in the NFL for the 2014 regular season, but first-round pick OG Zack Martin (whom the Cowboys had drafted instead of Manziel) would have a well deserved All-Pro season while establishing himself as a critical piece in what many considered to be the best offensive line in the NFL. The stout run-blocking of the Cowboys' offensive line would help two different Cowboys running backs (DeMarco Murray in 2014 and Ezekiel Elliott in 2016 and 2018) win 3 NFL rushing titles in 5 seasons.

Following a win against the Indianapolis Colts in Week 16 (and after the Philadelphia Eagles' loss to the Washington Redskins), the Cowboys clinched the NFC East title, putting them in the playoffs for the first time since 2009. The Cowboys finished 12–4, improving on their 8–8 record from 2013. For the season, the team was 8–0 on the road. Plenty of milestones were established by the 2014 Cowboys team, topped by DeMarco Murray's record-setting rushing season. The Cowboys defeated the Detroit Lions at home 24–20 in the Wild Card round of the playoffs and advanced to the Divisional round.  However, the Green Bay Packers defeated them 26–21, handing the Cowboys their first road loss and ending their season.

Staff

Rosters

Opening preseason roster

Week one roster

Final roster

Preseason

Regular season

Schedule

Note: Intra-division opponents are in bold text.

Game summaries

Week 1: vs. San Francisco 49ers

Game notes
The Cowboys were 16–17–1 against the San Francisco 49ers from 1960 to 2014. Since then, Dallas won the next three meetings, in 2016, 2017, and 2020. But the Cowboys would lose to the 49ers in the 2021 wild-card round of the playoffs.

Week 2: at Tennessee Titans

Game notes

The win against the Titans meant that the Cowboys wouldn't start 0–2, which they hadn't done since 2010, when Wade Phillips was fired midway through the season and Jason Garrett was promoted to head coach.

Week 3: at St. Louis Rams

Game notes

The Cowboys' 21-point comeback win against the Rams was a new Cowboys' record for the largest point deficit that a Cowboys team had come back from and won in a game that didn't go into overtime. It was the third 21-point comeback victory in Cowboys' history. The other two came in overtime, in 1984 against New Orleans and 1999 against Washington.

The Rams' 2nd-quarter 21-point lead was the second-largest lead blown by the Rams. The biggest deficit overcome by a Rams opponent was 23 points by the Packers in 1982, and Denver had a 21-point rally in 1982.

Cowboys kicker Dan Bailey set a franchise record by making his 28th field goal in a row on a 40-yarder in the third quarter. Cowboys kicker Chris Boniol hit 27 straight field goals in 1996.

Week 4: vs. New Orleans Saints

Game notes
After 4 weeks of regular season play, DeMarco Murray found himself in elite company with his 149-yard 2 touchdown performance against the Saints, joining Jim Brown, O. J. Simpson and former Cowboy Emmitt Smith as the only players to rush for 100 or more yards, while scoring a touchdown, in the first four games of a season.

The Cowboys' three-game winning streak was their first since the 2012 season.

Week 5: vs. Houston Texans

Game notes
After hauling in a 34-yard completion from Tony Romo mid-way through the third quarter, Cowboys TE Jason Witten surpassed 10,000 receiving yards for his career, making him only the 3rd tight end in NFL history to do so. Witten's 59-yard day against the Texans left him just 46 yards shy of the No. 2 position held at the time by Shannon Sharpe with 10,060 career receiving yards. Tony Gonzalez led all tight ends in career receiving yards at 15,127.

The Cowboys' four-game winning streak was their first since 2011, and their best start since 2008.

Week 6: at Seattle Seahawks

Game notes
DeMarco Murray's 115-yard rushing day against the Seahawks made him only the second running back in NFL history – next to Jim Brown – to rush for 100 yards in the first 6 games of the season. Jim Brown did it for the first six games of the 1958 season.

With the victory, the Cowboys improved to 5–1 on the season, their best record since the 2007 campaign.

Dallas became the first team outside the NFC West to win in Seattle since 2011.

Five days after Seattle's loss at home to the Cowboys, the Seahawks traded WR Percy Harvin to the New York Jets for an undisclosed draft selection. It was reported that the surprisingly sudden move by Seattle was due in large part to Harvin refusing to return to the game in the fourth quarter. While Harvin had a 46-yard kickoff return, his total yardage for rushing and receiving was –1 yard against the Cowboys.

Dan Bailey's 3rd quarter 42-yard field goal made him 100-for-110 on field goals for his career, making him the most accurate kicker in NFL history with a FG percentage of 90.826% from 2011 to 2014. Mike Vanderjagt was second in all-time NFL accuracy with a FG percentage of 86.466% from 1998 to 2006. Stephen Gostkowski was a close third in NFL accuracy with a FG percentage of 86.328% from 2006 to 2014.

Week 7: vs. New York Giants

Game notes
DeMarco Murray continued his amazing season by rushing for his seventh straight 100-yard game to start a season, breaking the record held by the great Jim Brown.

With the win over the Giants, the Cowboys improved to a league-best 6–1 on the season, moving into sole possession of first place in the NFC East due to the Eagles having a bye week. This was the Cowboys' best start to a season since 2007 when they also were 6–1 after the first 7 games.

Week 8: vs. Washington Redskins

Game notes
Colt McCoy completed 83.3 percent of his passes (25–30 for 299 yards), the most in Redskins history by a quarterback with at least 30 attempts.

Murray extended his 100-yard game rushing streak to eight games with 19 carries for 141 yards.

The game was the 107th meeting in 54 years between the Cowboys and the Redskins. After the loss to Washington, the Cowboys now had a total of 64 wins to 41 losses and 2 ties in 54 years.

Including the loss to the Redskins on Monday Night, the Cowboys had played in a total of 75 Monday Night games and had an overall record of 43–32.

Week 9: vs. Arizona Cardinals

Game notes
Brandon Weeden started in place of Tony Romo, who had injured himself the week prior. Weeden had a rough time of it against the stingy Cardinals defense, throwing two interceptions and only managed to compile 183 yards through the air.

It was the Cowboys' third home loss of the season, and the same score as the season opener against the 49ers. The Cardinals also managed to hold DeMarco Murray under the 100-yard mark, the first team to do so in 2014.

Week 10: at Jacksonville Jaguars
NFL International Series

Game notes
Tony Romo's return was a successful one, as the Cowboys went across the pond and posted a comfortable win over one of the worst teams in the league.

Dez Bryant had a monster day receiving, catching six passes for 158 yards and two scores, all in the first half. DeMarco Murray got back in the 100-yard category after losing his streak in the loss to the Cardinals the week before.

Week 12: at New York Giants

Game notes
The Cowboys swept their season series against the Giants for the second year in a row. The Cowboys beat the Giants 5 out of the 6 meetings from 2012 to 2014.

With the win, Dallas improved to 8–3 on the season, setting up a showdown with the 8–3 Eagles for first place in the NFC East on Thanksgiving Day.

DeMarco Murray went over 100 yards yet again, rushing for 121 yards but failed to get in the end zone.

Giants rookie wide receiver Odell Beckham Jr. finished his historic night with 10 catches for 146 yards and two scores.

Rapper and New York City native Jay Z attended the game and was seen having a brief conversation with Jerry Jones on the field prior to kickoff. This was somewhat of an event due to Jay Z's agency, Roc Nation, signing on as Dez Bryant's representation earlier in the month. The pair spoke briefly before the game, which led to questions about whether they were discussing Bryant's contract negotiations. Jones later claimed that the brief conversation had nothing to do with contract negotiations.

Week 13: vs. Philadelphia Eagles
Thanksgiving Day game

Game notes
With the 33–10 victory against Dallas, the Eagles were now 2–0 against the Cowboys on Thanksgiving Day and 6–0 overall for Thanksgiving games.

Tony Romo's 38-game streak with at least one touchdown pass came to an end against Philadelphia. Romo's 38-game touchdown streak was the longest in franchise history and fifth longest in NFL history and the second-longest among active streaks, behind Peyton Manning's 50. Romo was 18 of 29 for 199 yards and 0 TDs in the loss.

It was the fourth loss of the season for Dallas at home, and DeMarco Murray failed to break 100 yards for only the second time this season.

Week 14: at Chicago Bears

Game notes
With the win, the Cowboys avoided going 8–8 for the first time since 2010, and clinched a winning season, the first since the 2009 team won the NFC East and won a playoff game.

After defeating the Bears in Chicago, the Cowboys were 6–0 on the road after 13 games into their 2014 season. Oddly enough, the last time Dallas lost on the road was in Chicago 45–28 nearly a year earlier on December 9, 2013. That devastating loss to the Bears began the 7–5 Cowboys' late-season slide, losing 3 out of their 4 final games, and ending the year with a 3rd straight 8–8 season and no playoff appearance for the 4th year in a row.

Week 15: at Philadelphia Eagles

Game notes

For the second consecutive year, Dallas and Philadelphia split the season series with the road team winning all four games. Dallas had now won 5 out of their last 6 meetings in Philadelphia.

With the win, the Cowboys took a one-game lead in the NFC East with two games to go.

The victory over the Eagles in Philadelphia improved the Cowboys' road record to 7–0 for the season.

Week 16: vs. Indianapolis Colts

Game notes
Through the 2014 season, the Cowboys won the NFC East 22 times in their 54-year history.

After quarterback Tony Romo completed a 25-yard touchdown pass to TE Jason Witten late in the third quarter, Romo eclipsed Troy Aikman as the all-time leader in passing yards in franchise history. The throw put Romo at 32,961 passing yards in his career, passing Aikman's career total of 32,942. Romo finished the game with 218 yards, putting him at 32,971 for his career.

At the start of the game, Murray had a total of 1,686 yards on the season and needed only 87 yards to pass Hall of Famer Emmitt Smith's team record for the most rushing yards in a single season with 1,773 yards set in 1995. However, with Murray still nursing the injury, coupled with an early Cowboys rout, Murray ended up with only 22 carries for 59 yards on the day, leaving him with a total of 1,745 yards for the year, just 28 yards short of Smith's single season record with one more game left to be played.

Week 17: at Washington Redskins

Game notes
With the victory, the Cowboys finished 12–4 on the season, their best record since the team's 13–3 campaign of 2007.

DeMarco Murray made Cowboys' history by finishing the season with 1,845 yards on 393 carries, surpassing Emmitt Smith's record of 1,773 in 1995; the 32-yard carry was Murray's longest since a 40-yard carry on December 4 against the Chicago Bears.

Dez Bryant also made Cowboys' history by catching 2 touchdown passes, giving him a total of 16 touchdown receptions on the year, breaking Terrell Owens's previous single-season touchdown reception record of 15 in 2007 (the second touchdown was originally called incomplete by the refs, but was overturned after review).

The game was the 108th meeting in 54 years between the Cowboys and Redskins. After this game, the Cowboys' all-time record versus the Redskins was 65-41-2 in 54 years.

Standings

Division

Conference

Postseason

Schedule

Game summaries

NFC Wild Card Playoffs: vs. (6) Detroit Lions

Game notes 

The Dallas Cowboys now lead the all-time head-to-head match-up against the Detroit Lions (14–12). The Cowboys also lead the all-time playoff match-up against the Lions (2–1).

This was the first time in franchise history that the Cowboys won a post-season game when trailing by 10 points or more at half time.

At the time, with this win over the Lions, the Cowboys became the team with the most NFL playoff wins with 34, one more than the Pittsburgh Steelers.

NFC Divisional Playoffs: at (2) Green Bay Packers

Game notes 
The Packers defeated the Cowboys 26–21, ending their season. The Packers handed the Cowboys their first road loss of the season, snapping a 9-game road winning streak that began in week 16 of the 2013 season against the Washington Redskins.

References

External links
 
 

Dallas
Dallas Cowboys seasons
NFC East championship seasons
Dallas
2010s in Dallas
2014 in Texas